The Wendell Commercial Historic District is a national historic district encompassing the historic central business district of Wendell, North Carolina, a town in eastern Wake County. The district is notable for its intact collection of one- and two-story brick masonry commercial buildings executed in the vernacular style typical of eastern North Carolina communities in the first half of the twentieth century.  The roughly three-block district is bounded on the north by the 1906 Raleigh-Pamlico Railroad tracks, on the east by Pine Street, on the south by the rear property lines of the structures fronting Third Street, and on the west by the rear property lines of the buildings fronting Main Street.  The district was listed on the National Register of Historic Places in July 1998.

Buildings

See also

 List of Registered Historic Places in North Carolina

References

Historic districts on the National Register of Historic Places in North Carolina
National Register of Historic Places in Wake County, North Carolina
Geography of Wake County, North Carolina